Brežani may refer to:

 Brežani (Kakanj), a village in Bosnia and Herzegovina
 Brežani (Srebrenica), a village in Bosnia and Herzegovina
 Brežani, Serbia, a village near Blace, Serbia
 Brežani, Croatia, a village near Karlovac, Croatia
 Brežani, Macedonia, a village in Debarca Municipality, Republic of Macedonia